Sally Gail Fox (January 30, 1951 – January 10, 2014) was an American lawyer and politician.

Sally Fox was born on January 30, 1951, in Omaha, Nebraska, to Philip and Delores Fox. Fox received a bachelor's degree in social work from University of Wisconsin–Madison and a Juris Doctor degree from University at Buffalo Law School.

Fox met Michael Sirotkin while taking a class in preparation for the Colorado bar exam. They married on October 7, 1979. Fox and Sirotkin moved to Vermont when Sirotkin received a job offer there.

Prior to entering politics, Fox worked as an attorney for the Vermont Disabilities Law Project of Vermont Legal Aid.

A Democrat, Fox represented Chittenden County in the Vermont House of Representatives from 1987 to 2001. Fox then began serving in the Vermont State Senate from 2011. Outside of politics, Fox was the director of Family Courts for the Judiciary of Vermont. She was also Vermont Businesses for Social Responsibility's director of policy. Fox coordinated the City of Burlington's Offender Reentry Program, and she was Vermont State Colleges' governmental affairs director.

On January 10, 2014, after a two-year battle with a rare form of lung cancer, Fox died in South Burlington, Vermont. Fox's husband, Michael Sirotkin, was appointed to take Fox's place in the Vermont Senate.

Notes

1951 births
2014 deaths
Jewish American state legislators in Vermont
Politicians from Omaha, Nebraska
People from South Burlington, Vermont
University of Wisconsin-Madison School of Social Work alumni
University at Buffalo Law School alumni
Vermont lawyers
Women state legislators in Vermont
Democratic Party Vermont state senators
Democratic Party members of the Vermont House of Representatives
Deaths from lung cancer
Deaths from cancer in Vermont
20th-century American lawyers
20th-century American women
21st-century American Jews
21st-century American women